Meade Hill is a mountain located in the Catskill Mountains of New York east of Arkville. Fleischmann Mountain is located east of Meade Hill.

References

Mountains of Delaware County, New York
Mountains of New York (state)